Johnathan Gray (born April 22, 1993) is an American football running back who is currently a free agent. He last played for the Frisco Fighters of the Indoor Football League in 2021. He played college football for the University of Texas at Austin. He attended Aledo High School in Aledo, Texas. Gray earned a 2011 USA Today High School All-American nomination, and was also named Gatorade National Player of the Year. After becoming the first junior to win ESPN HS Mr. Football USA, he became the first two-time winner of the award following the 2011 high school football season.

Gray chose the University of Texas over Arkansas, Auburn, TCU, and Texas A&M.

High school career
Gray attended Aledo High School in Aledo, Texas where he broke the all-time high school touchdown record with 205 eclipsing Mike Hart's record of 204 touchdowns.  As a junior, he rushed for 323 yards and eight touchdowns in the Texas Class 4A Division II championship game against La Marque High School on December 17 at Cowboys Stadium, which gave him a total of 59 rushing touchdowns for the 2010 high school football season and surpassed Kenneth Hall's single-season record of 57 set in 1953. Gray had rushed for 252 yards and four touchdowns in the 2009 state championship victory over Brenham High School. In 2011, Gray led Aledo to its third straight state championship with 241 rushing yards. Along the way, he scored his 205th touchdown establishing the national high school career record. He finished his high school career first all-time in touchdowns and second all-time in points scored.

Track and field
Gray was also on the school's track & field team, where he competed as a sprinter. He was a 3 time district champion in the 100-meter dash. As a junior in 2009, he won the 100 meters at the 4th Johnny Perkins Pirate Relays, with a career-best time of 10.58 seconds. He also competed in the 200 meters, placing fifth at the 2009 Elk Relays.

Recruiting

College career

College career statistics

Gray tore his right Achilles tendon in 2013, and his left Achilles in 2015. The tendon tears put Gray's career on hold, and Gray went undrafted in the 2016 NFL Draft.

Professional career

NFL and CFL tryouts
Several NFL teams showed interest in Gray as a free agent following the draft.  In 2017, after demonstrating a 4.5-second 40-yard dash and a 36-inch vertical leap at the annual Texas Pro Day workout, Gray landed a tryout with the New York Giants.  After attending the Giants' rookie camp, Gray received invites to rookie camps for the Calgary Stampeders, Winnipeg Blue Bombers and Saskatchewan Roughriders of the Canadian Football League; however, Gray ultimately never played for any of them.

Frisco Fighters
On April 8, 2021, the Frisco Fighters announced that they had signed Gray for the 2021 season.

References

External links
Texas Longhorns bio

1993 births
Living people
People from Aledo, Texas
American football running backs
Texas Longhorns football players